Go-Feet Records was an English record label founded by, and predominantly used to release recordings by, the ska revival band the Beat (known as the English Beat in North America). The band had some chart success in the United Kingdom in the 1980s. The label also released a few recordings by other bands. The Beat's first release was on 2 Tone Records, but when Madness struck a deal with Stiff Records, the Beat left to form their own label. Go-Feet now operates under BMG Rights Management.

The label was distributed over the years by labels such as Arista, London, Edsel and finally, BMG Rights Management.

Albums
The Beat: I Just Can't Stop It (BEAT 1, 1980) 	
The Congos: Heart of the Congos (BEAT 2, 1980 reissue) 	
The Beat: Wha'ppen? (BEAT 3, 1981)	
Cedric Myton & The Congos: Face the Music (BEAT 4, 1981)	
The Beat: Special Beat Service (BEAT 5, 1982) 	
The Beat: What Is Beat? (BEAT 6, 1983 compilation)

7" singles

See also
 List of record labels

External links 
 Fan site giving complete discography, history, etc

British record labels
Ska record labels